Sokoto United is a Nigerian football club based in Sokoto. They play in the second-tier division in Nigerian football, the Nigeria National League. (Giginya Memorial Stadium) is their home. It has capacity for 5,000 people.

Football clubs in Nigeria
Sports clubs in Nigeria